Jet Tilakamonkul, known professionally as Jet Tila, is an American celebrity chef, author, restaurateur, and restaurant developer.

Early life
Tila was born in Los Angeles to Thai Chinese parents who immigrated to the United States separately in 1966. His family traces their ancestry to the southern Chinese island province of Hainan.

Restaurant and culinary career
Jet Tila is the chef of the restaurants The Charleston and Pakpao Thai, both  located in Los Angeles, California. Tila is the restaurant developer of Dragon Tiger Noodle Co. with three locations in Las Vegas and Henderson, Nevada. Tila has acted as a restaurant developer and minor partner for the chain restaurant Pei Wei Asian Kitchen (also known as Pei Wei Asian Diner, LLC).

Tila was given a ceremonial title of a "culinary ambassador" for Thailand, appointed by the Royal Thai Consulate-General in Los Angeles.

Tila has also been part of several novelty food-based records, including world's largest stir fry, world's largest seafood stew, world's largest fruit salad and world's largest California roll.

Television and other media 
He has appeared on television series including Beat Bobby Flay, The Best Thing I Ever Ate, Chopped, Cutthroat Kitchen, and Guy's Grocery Games. Tila is a regular on the Food Network television channel. He was a contestant on Iron Chef America but lost to The Iron Chef. In 2018, he returned to Iron Chef America as the floor reporter. Tila appeared on Gods of Food, a satirical food mockumentary by CollegeHumor. his appearances, Tila won $20,000 as the victorious competitor in Guy's Grocery Games "Delivery: All-Star Noodles" (2021). Tila is one of the co-hosts of the new Food Network show, Halloween Cookie Challenge.

Personal life
Tila is married. He and his wife Allison have two children: a daughter, Amaya, and a son, Ren.

Publications

References

External links

Chefs from California
American male chefs
American people of Chinese descent
American people of Thai descent
American restaurateurs
Food Network chefs
Living people
1975 births
People from Los Angeles
Chefs from Los Angeles
American television chefs